The Bagan Datuk class are a series of patrol vessels of the Malaysia Coast Guard. The class comprises six  vessels built by the Malaysian company Destini Berhad, based on Germany's Fassmer design. The class is also known as the New Generation Patrol Craft (NGPC) and the class named after the first ship of the class, KM Bagan Datuk.

Development

In the 2015 Malaysian budget presentation, Prime Minister Najib Tun Razak allocated RM393 million to purchase six new patrol vessels. The contract for the six ships was awarded to the Malaysian company Destini Berhad in November 2015 and all the ships were completed by late 2018.

Ships of the class

References 

Patrol vessels of Malaysia